Amadeusz Skrzyniarz (born 7 July 1994) is a Polish footballer who plays as a goalkeeper for Lymington Town.

Career
Skrzyniarz began his career in his native Poland, appearing five times in the I liga for Chrobry Głogów.

In October 2015, Skryzniarz signed for Romsey Town in England. In October 2019, Skrzyniarz signed for AFC Totton. In June 2021, he joined Wessex League side Blackfield & Langley on a season-long loan deal. In the summer of 2022, Skrzyniarz joined Southern League Division One South side Lymington Town on a permanent deal, having spent time on loan at the club during the previous season.

References

External links

Non-league stats at Aylesbury United

1994 births
Living people
Polish footballers
Expatriate footballers in England
People from Dzierżoniów
Association football goalkeepers
Polish expatriate footballers
Zagłębie Lubin players
MKS Kluczbork players
Chrobry Głogów players
Romsey Town F.C. players
A.F.C. Totton players
I liga players
Polish expatriate sportspeople in England
Lymington Town F.C. players
Blackfield & Langley F.C. players
Southern Football League players
Wessex Football League players